The massive-gibber ctenotus (Ctenotus septenarius)  is a species of skink found in the Northern Territory in Australia.

References

septenarius
Reptiles described in 1988
Taxa named by Max King (herpetologist)
Taxa named by Paul Horner (herpetologist)
Taxa named by Greg Fyfe (herpetologist)